Bobbie Mortimer Furler (28 June 1918 – 13 August 1998) was an Australian rules footballer who played for Hawthorn in the Victorian Football League (VFL).

Furler, who was a nephew of North Adelaide champion Percy Furler started his career in South Australia, playing at North Adelaide where he won the Most Consistent player trophy in 1940. After a few years service in the RAAF and the Australian Army, he played with Hawthorn. Furler's next port of call was CANFL club Ainslie in Canberra. He captain-coached Ainslie to the premiership in 1947. He represented the territory at the 1947 Hobart Carnival, in section two, and shared the Tassie Medal with Les McClements.

References

External links

1918 births
1998 deaths
Australian rules footballers from South Australia
Hawthorn Football Club players
North Adelaide Football Club players
Ainslie Football Club players
Royal Australian Air Force personnel of World War II
Australian Army personnel of World War II